The 2013 Mountain West Conference baseball tournament took place from May 22 through 26.  All six of the league's teams met in the double-elimination tournament held at California State University, Fresno's Pete Beiden Field.  It was Fresno State's first year in the league after joining from the Western Athletic Conference.  San Diego State won the tournament for the second time, earning the Mountain West Conference's automatic bid to the 2013 NCAA Division I baseball tournament.

Format and seeding
The conference's six teams were seeded based on winning percentage during the round robin regular season schedule.  The top two seeds received a bye to the second round, with the top seed playing the lowest seeded team that won its first round game, and the second seeded team playing the higher seeded first day winner.  The losers of the first day's games played an elimination game in the double-elimination format.

Bracket

All-Tournament Team
The following players were named to the All-Tournament Team.

Most Valuable Player
Tyler France was named Tournament Most Valuable Player.  France was a freshman for San Diego State.

Championship Winning Pitcher

Philip Walby of San Diego State was the Starting and Winning Pitcher of two games, including the Championship Game vs. New Mexico.

References

Mountain West Conference baseball tournament
Mountain West Conference baseball tournament
Tournament
Mountain West Conference baseball tournament
College sports tournaments in California
Baseball in Fresno, California
Sports competitions in Fresno, California